, sometimes credited as his real name , is a Japanese actor, voice actor and narrator who was born in Kofu, Yamanashi. Ginga is affiliated with Aoni Production. He is married to voice actress Gara Takashima.

Known for his deep baritone voice, his most well-known roles include Gihren Zabi (Mobile Suit Gundam), Crocodine (Dragon Quest: Dai no Daibōken), Jean Paul Rocchina (Armored Trooper Votoms), Shōhei Harada (Touch), Souther (Fist of the North Star, original 1980s series), Babbo (MÄR), Bayman in the Dead or Alive series, Heihachi Mishima and the various models of Jack in the Tekken series, and Liquid Snake and Zero in the Metal Gear series.

His hobbies include painting, salsa dance, riding horses and playing music.

On November 5, 2020, it was announced Ginga had tested positive for COVID-19. On November 16, 2020, it was announced that he had recovered.

Filmography

Television animation
1977
Planet Robot Danguard Ace – Doppler

1978
Daikengo – Doctor Gudda, Emperor Mazeran
The Perrine Story – Theodor
Muteki Kōjin Daitarn 3 – Neros

1979
Entaku no Kishi Monogatari: Moero Arthur – Labick
Mobile Suit Gundam – Gihren Zabi, Cozun Graham
Koguma no Misha – Misha's Father
Cyborg 009 – Geronimo Junior/005, Vishnu

1980
Space Warrior Baldios – Alan, King Bado
Astro Boy – Gallon
Densetsu Kyojin Ideon – Damido Pecchi
Mahou Shoujo Lalabel – Viscous
Moero Arthur: Hakuba no Oji – Labick

1981
Swiss Family Robinson – Edward
Galaxy Cyclone Braiger – Rasputin
Tiger Mask II – Antonio Inoki
Taiyou no Kiba Dougram – Chico
Dr. Slump – Mr. Kimidori
Hello! Sandybell – Edward

1982
Ai no Senshi Rainbowman – Heinz Shousa
Ochamegami Monogatari Korokoro Poron – Poseidan
Armored Fleet Dairugger XV – Caponero, Mack Chukker
Galactic Gale Baxinger – Geruba Zorba
The Kabocha Wine – Dekkin
Space Adventure Cobra – Col. Velga
Sentō Mecha Xabungle – Fatman Big, Narrator, Timp
Fuku-chan – Mr. Arakuma

1983
Genesis Climber Mospeada – Jonathan Wolf
Armored Trooper Votoms – Jan Paul Rocchina, Narration
The Super Dimension Century Orguss – Jabby, Narrator
Nanako SOS – Dr. Ishikawa

1984
Panzer World Galient – Council of Legislators
Heavy Metal L-Gaim – Maph McTomin
Fist of the North Star – Souther, Fake Yuda, Resistance Leader
Star Musketeer Bismark – Zatola
The Super Dimension Cavalry Southern Cross – Georges Sullivan
Lupin III: Part III – Arnold Oosa
Galactic Patrol Lensman – Ban Baskark

1985
Konpora Kid – Shinryuu Kyoutou
A Little Princess Sara – Ralph
Touch – Shohei Harada
Dancougar - Super Beast Machine God – Alan
Hai Step Jun – Oohata-sensei

1986
Ai Shoujo Pollyanna Monogatari – Pendelton
Uchūsen Sagittarius – Ganre, Franken
Ginga Nagareboshi Gin – Riki
Sangokushi II: Tenkakeru Hideotachi – Xiahou Yuan
Dragon Ball – Bora, Colonel Silver, Giran
Bosco Daibōken – Hoodman

1987
Around the World with Willy Fog – Willy Fog
ESPer Mami – Narrator
City Hunter – Harukawa
Saint Seiya – Cassios, Jango
Transformers: The Headmasters – Scorponok/Mega Zarak
Highschool! Kimengumi – Hitoma Rokujō
Bug tte Honey – Analog Satan, King Juriden
Mister Ajikko – Aji Shogun

1988
Sakigake!! Otoko Juku – J
Tatakae!! Ramenman – Hogan, Jinlong (Kinryū)
Sonic Soldier Borgman – Gilbert Mesh
Transformers: Super God Masterforce – Black Zarak
Himitsu no Akko-chan – Ken'ichirou Gagami

1989
Obocchama-kun – Kamemitsu Obō
Jungle Book Shōnen Mowgli – Baloo
Transformers: Victory – Clamp's Father
Dragon Ball Z – Bora, King Vegeta, Moai
Madō King Granzort – Giant

1990
Pygmalio – Agnard
Transformers: Zone - BlackZarak

1991
Dragon Quest: Dai no Daibōken – Crocodine
Nadia the Secret of Blue Water – Voice of the Red Noah
Moero! Top Striker – Robson

1993
Kenyū Densetsu Yaiba – Onick
Tanoshii Willow Town – Narrator

1995
Street Fighter II V – Sagat
Sorcerer Hunters – Saj Torte, Narrator

1996
Kaiketsu Zorro – Sabato
The Vision of Escaflowne – Adelphos

1997
Kindaichi Shounen no Jikenbo – Minamiyama

1998
Eat-Man '98 – Senator Sharif
Detective Conan – Tsuneaki Niikura
Yu-Gi-Oh! – Doctor

1999
Cowboy Bebop – "Mad Pierrot" Tongpu
Himitsu no Akko-chan – Antonio Baba
Master of Mosquiton '99 – Frankie Negger
Blue Gender – Dice Quaid (Episode 7–9)
One Piece – Axe Morgan

2000
Cyborg Kuro-chan – Ahab

2001
Vandread: The Second Stage – Kokopeli
Noir – Remy Breffort
Kirby: Right Back at Ya! – N.M.E. Sales Guy, eNeMeE
Run=Dim – Sōichi Yagihara

2002
Tenshi na Konamaiki – Megumi Amatsuka's father

2003
Astro Boy – Police Inspector Tawashi

2004
F-Zero Falcon Densetsu – Blood Falcon
Onmyou Taisenki – Mikazuchi, Narrator
Cromartie High School – Narrator (ep 23)
Viewtiful Joe – Captain Blue
Monster – Rosso
Yugo the Negotiator – Ali

2005
The Law of Ueki – Baron
Onmyou Taisenki – Akagane no Itsumu
GUNxSWORD – Narrator
Gallery Fake – Professor Maruyama
Eureka Seven – Greg "Dr. Bear" Eagan
Shinshaku Sengoku Eiyū Densetsu - Sanada Jū Yūshi The Animation – Matabei Mototsugu Goto
MÄR – Babbo

2006
Ergo Proxy – Intelligence Bureau Chief
009-1 – Phantom
Black Lagoon – Verrocchio
Black Lagoon: The Second Barrage – Verrocchio
Bartender – Ryuuichi Minegishi

2007
Hero Tales – Keirō
Deltora Quest – The Shadow Lord
Bamboo Blade – Narrator (ep 11)

2008
Black Butler – Damiano
Kurozuka (novel) – Kurumasou
Golgo 13 – Sabine Brother Elder
Hell Girl: Three Vessels – Norisha Takasugi
Scarecrowman – Ernest
Psychic Squad – Elec Teru
Hakaba Kitarō – Dr. Gamotsu

2009
Kiddy Girl-and – Ascoeur (male)
Gintama – Hōsen
Chrome Shelled Regios – Ryuhou Gash
Golgo 13 – Spartacus
The Girl Who Leapt Through Space – Nerval
Birdy the Mighty Decode:02 – Agrazume
One Piece – Scarlet

2010
Fairy Tail – Mr. Heartfilia
Beyblade: Metal Masters – African DJ

2011
Ghastly Prince Enma Burning Up – Kan Tengu
Toriko – Yosaku
Nichijou – Narrator
Hunter X Hunter – Netero

2012
Toriko – Baidan

2013
Kyousougiga – God, Narrator
Hayate the Combat Butler! Cuties – Armageddon
Maoyu – Old Archer

2014
La Corda d'Oro Blue Sky – Genichi Tōgane
Space Dandy – Commodore Perry
Marvel Disk Wars: The Avengers – Magneto
D-Frag! – Narrator (ep 8)
Hunter × Hunter – Isaac Netero (eps 122–126)
Hero Bank – Sennen
Momokyun Sword – Jakiō
One Piece – Riku Dold III (eps 666+)

2015
Mysterious Joker – Jason
Blood Blockade Battlefront – Gilbert F. Altstein
Food Wars! Shokugeki no Soma – Senzaemon Nakiri
JoJo's Bizarre Adventure: Stardust Crusaders – Daniel J. D'Arby
Seiyu's Life! – Himself
Magical Somera-chan – General
Fist of the North Star: Strawberry Flavor – Souther

2017
Magical Circle Guru Guru – Deemon Lord Giri (ep 16, 23 - 24)

2018
GeGeGe no Kitarō 6th series – Nanashi (eps 1 - 3, 11 - 12, 19, 25, 27, 35 - 37, 42, 47 - 48)
Baki - Dorian

2020
Listeners – Robert

2021
Night Head 2041 – Kyōjirō Mikuriya

Original video animation (OVA)
Transformers: Scramble City (1986) – Ultra Magnus
The Guyver: Bio-Booster Armor (1989) – Gaster
3×3 Eyes (1991-1992) – Steve Long
Legend of the Galactic Heroes (1992) – De Villiers
Konpeki no Kantai (1993) – Admiral Eisaku Takasugi
Macross Plus (1994) – Raymond
Mobile Suit Gundam: The 08th MS Team (1996) – Gihren Zabi
Slayers (1996) – Randy's wizard
Final Fantasy VII: Advent Children (2005) – Reeve Tuesti
Mobile Suit Gundam: The Origin (2015) – Gihren Zabi
Golden Kamuy (2019) – Kiichirō Wakayama

Theatrical animation
Mobile Suit Gundam (1981) – Gihren Zabi
Mobile Suit Gundam: Encounters in Space (1982) – Gihren Zabi
Lupin III: The Plot of the Fuma Clan (1987) – Daisuke Jigen 
Neo Tokyo (1987) – Zack Hugh
Dragon Ball: Mystical Adventure (1988) – Bora
Dragon Ball Z: The Tree of Might (1990) – Armond
Lupin III: Dead or Alive (1996) – Headhunting General
Elmer's Adventure: My Father's Dragon (1997) – Tiger
Doraemon: Nobita in the Robot Kingdom (2002) – Robbie
Doraemon: Nobita's New Great Adventure into the Underworld (2007) – Demon King
Crayon Shin-chan: The Storm Called: The Hero of Kinpoko (2008) – Sweat duct Dark
Kingsglaive: Final Fantasy XV (2016) – Clarus Amicitia
Dragon Ball Super: Broly (2018) – King Vegeta
Crayon Shin-chan: Honeymoon Hurricane ~The Lost Hiroshi~ (2019)
Kingdom of Gold, Kingdom of Water (2023) – Rastavan III

Video games

Ar tonelico: Melody of Elemia – Leard Barsett
Ar tonelico II: Melody of Metafalica – Dr. Laude
Blood Gear – Bey Eurct Degner
Dragon Ball Z: Budokai Tenkaichi 3 – King Vegeta
Front Mission 5: Scars of the War – Morgan Bernard
Granblue Fantasy – Eahta/Okto
Gungrave – Zell Condorbrave
Heavy Rain – Scott Shelby (Japanese dub)
Last Alert – Dr. Garcia
Makeruna! Makendō 2 – Makenpo
Rockman ZX Advent – Bifrost the Crocoroid
Phantasy Star Online 2 – Schlegger Verun
Shadow Hearts: From the New World – Frank Goldfinger
Shadow the Hedgehog – Commander
Shining Force EXA – Avalon
Super Robot Wars Original Generations – Ruozorl Zoran Royell
Super Robot Wars series – Gihren Zabi, Mafu Makutomin, Damido Pechi, Timp Sharon, Fatman Big, Commander Nerosu, Garan
Tekken – Heihachi Mishima, Jack, Prototype Jack, Ganryu
Tekken 2 – Jack-2, Prototype Jack
Tekken 3 – Gun Jack
Tekken Tag Tournament – Gun Jack, Jack-2, Prototype Jack
Tekken Advance – Gun Jack
Tekken 5 – Jack-5
Tengai Makyō: Ziria – Gomon
Ys I and II – Narrator, Dama 
Crash Bandicoot: N Sane Trilogy — Koala Kong

Tokusatsu
 X-Bomber (1980) – Emperor Gelma, Kirara
 Choushinsei Flashman (1986) – Ley Baraki (ep 17 - 19)
 Kousoku Sentai Turboranger (1989) – Saint Beast Lakia (ep 2)
 Bakuryū Sentai Abaranger (2003) – Burstosaur Brachiosaurus (eps 1 - 17, 19 - 34, 36, 37, 39 - 50)
 Bakuryū Sentai Abaranger DELUXE: Abare Summer is Freezing Cold! (2003) – Burstosaur Brachiosaurus
 Bakuryū Sentai Abaranger vs. Hurricaneger (2004) – Burstosaur Brachiosaurus
 Tokusou Sentai Dekaranger vs. Abaranger (2005) – Burstosaur Brachiosaurus
 GoGo Sentai Boukenger (2006) – Gekkou of Illusion (eps 3, 5, 9, 12, 14, 17, 22, 25, 32, 35, 38, 40–42, 44, 46, 49)
 GoGo Sentai Boukenger The Movie: The Greatest Precious (2006) – Gekkou of Illusion
 Samurai Sentai Shinkenger vs. Go-onger: GinmakuBang!!  (2010) – Pollution President Batcheed
 Kamen Rider OOO (2011) – Ika-Jaguar Yummy (ep 27 - 28)
 Kaizoku Sentai Gokaiger (2011) – Pollution President Babatcheed (ep 35 - 36)
 Kaizoku Sentai Gokaiger vs. Space Sheriff Gavan: The Movie (2012) – Gekkou of Illusion
 Kikai Sentai Zenkaiger (2021) - Zenryoku Zenkai Cannon (eps 30 - 49)

Dubbing roles

Live-action
Michael Dorn
Star Trek: The Next Generation – Worf
Star Trek: Deep Space Nine – Worf
Star Trek: First Contact – Worf
Star Trek: Insurrection – Worf
Star Trek: Nemesis – Worf
Ted 2 – Rick
Michael Clarke Duncan
The Green Mile (2002 Fuji TV edition) – John Coffey
See Spot Run – Murdoch
The Scorpion King – Balthazar
Sin City – Manute
CSI: NY – Quinn Sullivan
Josh Brolin
Guardians of the Galaxy – Thanos
Avengers: Age of Ultron – Thanos
Avengers: Infinity War – Thanos
Avengers: Endgame – Thanos
Delroy Lindo
Broken Arrow (1999 NTV edition) – USAF Colonel Max Wilkins
A Life Less Ordinary – Jackson
Romeo Must Die – Isaak O'Day
The Core (2005 TV Asahi edition) – Dr. Edward "Braz" Brazzelton
Keith David
Marked for Death (1995 TV Asahi edition) – Max Keller
Article 99 – Luther Jermoe
The Quick and the Dead (1997 TV Asahi edition) – Sgt. Clay Cantrell
Armageddon (2002 Fuji TV edition) – General Kimsey
Tony Todd
Final Destination – William Bludworth
Final Destination 2 – William Bludworth
Final Destination 3 – The Devil
Transformers: Revenge of the Fallen – The Fallen
Cary-Hiroyuki Tagawa
Mortal Kombat – Shang Tsung 
Tekken – Heihachi Mishima
Tekken 2: Kazuya's Revenge – Heihachi Mishima
The Adventures of Huck Finn – Jim (Courtney B. Vance)
A.I. Artificial Intelligence – Teddy (Jack Angel)
Bad Boys – Fouchet (Tchéky Karyo)
Blade II (2005 TV Tokyo edition) – Reinhardt (Ron Perlman)
Bringing Out the Dead – Marcus (Ving Rhames)
Chain Reaction (1999 TV Asahi edition) – FBI Agent Leon Ford (Fred Ward)
The Day After – Billy McCoy (William Allen Young)
Desperate Housewives – Ian Hainsworth (Dougray Scott)
Dressed to Kill – Bobby (Michael Caine)
Dumbo – Baritone Bates (Michael Buffer)
Fearless Hyena Part II – Heaven Devil
First Blood (1993 Fuji TV edition) – John Rambo (Sylvester Stallone)
Game of Death – Hakim (Kareem Abdul-Jabbar)
Get Shorty – Ray "Bones" Barboni (Dennis Farina)
The Godfather (2001 DVD edition) – Virgil "The Turk" Sollozzo (Al Lettieri)
Godzilla – Philippe Roaché (Jean Reno)
The Great Escape (2000 TV Tokyo edition) – Flight Lieutenant Danny Welinski (Charles Bronson)
The Hobbit: The Desolation of Smaug – Master of Lake-town (Stephen Fry)
Holy Man – G (Eddie Murphy)
Indiana Jones and the Last Crusade (2009 WOWOW edition) – Henry Jones, Sr. (Sean Connery)
It's Complicated – Adam Schaffer (Steve Martin)
Jaws 2 (2022 BS Tokyo edition) – Mayor Larry Vaughn (Murray Hamilton)
The Magnificent Seven (2013 Star Channel edition) – Harry Luck (Brad Dexter)
The Man in the Iron Mask – Porthos (Gérard Depardieu)
Moonraker (1984 TBS edition) – Jaws (Richard Kiel)
Mortal Engines – Magnus Crome (Patrick Malahide)
Nick of Time – Huey The Shoes Shine Man (Charles S. Dutton)
Ocean's Twelve (2007 NTV edition) – Frank Catton (Bernie Mac)
The Rainbow Thief (2017 Blu-ray edition) – Prince Meleagre (Peter O'Toole)
Raw Deal (1988 TBS edition) – Sheriff Mark Kaminski / Joseph P. Brenner (Arnold Schwarzenegger)
The Shawshank Redemption (1997 TBS edition) – Byron Hadley (Clancy Brown)
Sherlock Holmes: A Game of Shadows – Mycroft Holmes (Stephen Fry)
Sin City: A Dame to Kill For – Manute (Dennis Haysbert)
Speed – Lieutenant "Mac" McMahon (Joe Morton)
Spider-Man 2 – Doctor Octopus (Alfred Molina)
Spider-Man: No Way Home – Doctor Octopus (Alfred Molina)
Stealing Beauty – Alex Parrish (Jeremy Irons)
Stuart Little – Crenshaw Little (Jeffrey Jones)
Steel – John Henry Irons/Steel (Shaquille O'Neal)
The Tiger: An Old Hunter's Tale – Chun Man-Duk (Choi Min-sik)
Tortured – Archie Green (Laurence Fishburne)
Twin Peaks – Sheriff Harry S. Truman (Michael Ontkean)
Underdog – Dan Unger (Jim Belushi)

Animation
Atlantis: The Lost Empire – Dr. Joshua Sweet
Atlantis: Milo's Return - Dr. Joshua Sweet
Batman: The Animated Series – Killer Croc
The Boss Baby – Wizzie
The Boss Baby: Family Business – Wizzie
The Dark Crystal – General
Hop – Mr. Bunny
Lightyear – Emperor Zurg
Planes: Fire & Rescue – Skipper Riley
The Secret Life of Pets – Pops
The Secret Life of Pets 2 – Pops
Tarzan – Clayton
What If...? – Thanos

Other
 Teddy Ruxpin: Grubby

References

External links
 Official agency profile 
 
 

1948 births
Living people
Male voice actors from Yamanashi Prefecture
Japanese male stage actors
Japanese male video game actors
Japanese male voice actors
Seikei University alumni
20th-century Japanese male actors
21st-century Japanese male actors
Aoni Production voice actors
People from Kōfu, Yamanashi